Kaneti is both a surname and a given name. Notable people with the name include:

Eli Kaneti, Israeli basketball coach
Kaneti Mohan Rao ( 1917–2014), Indian politician and activist

See also
Canetti